John Richardson (1810 – 22 December 1888) was an Australian pastoralist, store keeper and politician. He was a member of the New South Wales Legislative Council on three occasions (1851–54, 1855–56  and 1868–87) and a member of the New South Wales Legislative Assembly between 1856 and 1859.

Early life
Richardson was the son of a Presbyterian minister and was educated at parish schools. He  initially worked in London as a linen draper and emigrated to Sydney in 1838. Philosophically a liberal, he became politically active during the 1840s and 1850s and opposed the importation of cheap labour, whether coolie or convict and also opposed the conservative constitution proposed by William Wentworth. Richardson developed a number of pastoral stations in the Darling Downs region and also owned J. Richardson & Co, a department store in Armidale.

Parliament
In September 1851, prior to the establishment of responsible government, Richardson was elected to the seat of County of Stanley in the semi-elected Legislative Council. He represented the electorate until March 1854 when he resigned his seat to undertake a long tour of Britain. On his return in September 1855 he won a by-election for the Council seat of Stanley Boroughs (including Brisbane and Ipswich) which, prior to the establishment of Queensland as a separate colony in 1859, was part of New South Wales. At the first election under the new constitution he was elected to the Legislative Assembly as one of the two members for Stanley Boroughs. At the 1859 election, Richardson successfully stood for the seat of Brisbane but resigned from the seat when Queensland was granted self-government. In October 1868, he accepted a life appointment to the New South Wales Legislative Council. He did not hold a parliamentary or ministerial position.

Richardson's department store 
Richardson's (J. Richardson & Co Ltd) was a department store in Armidale, New South Wales, Australia that operated between 1842 and 1992.

History 
Richardson began his business in Brisbane, Queensland in 1842 dealing in imports from England and ships chandlery. After suffering great losses, in 1872, Richardson relocated to the Northern Tablelands town of Armidale and occupied a store purchased from John Moore. Later in 1879, Moore set up his business again nearby however it was bought out by the firm and became the furniture department of Richardson's. The building that stands today at 195 Beardy Street was built as a 'universal providers' emporium in 1904.

The business continued serving as a modern department store for Armidale until it was downsized and relocated to the old Capital Cinema building at 203 Beardy Street (now Bing Lee) in November 1983 and traded there until its final sale in April 1992.

Today 
The original and now heritage listed department store on Beardy Street is now part of the Armidale Plaza shopping centre complex with major tenants in the former space now called Richardson's arcade being the long-standing women's fashion outlet Sportsgirl, menswear retailer Gazman and various other businesses.

References

 

1810 births
1888 deaths
Members of the New South Wales Legislative Assembly
Members of the New South Wales Legislative Council
People from Fife
Scottish emigrants to colonial Australia
19th-century Australian politicians
Defunct department stores of Australia